Al-Mas'udiyya (also known as Summayl), was a Palestinian Arab village in the Jaffa Subdistrict. It was depopulated during the 1947–1948 Civil War in Mandatory Palestine on December 25, 1947. It was located 5 km northeast of Jaffa, situated 1.5 km south of the al-'Awja River. The village used to be known as Summayl.

History

In 1799, it was noted as an unnamed village on the map that Pierre Jacotin compiled that year.

An  Ottoman  village list from about 1870 showed that   Samwil had  23 houses and a population of 62, though the population count included men, only. It was noted as a Bedouin camp, 4,5 km north of Jaffa centre, and 1 km from the sea.

In 1882, the PEF's Survey of Western Palestine (SWP) described Summeil as an ordinary  adobe village,  which had a large  well, and a cave.

British Mandate era
In the 1922 census of Palestine, conducted by the British Mandate authorities, Mas'udiyeh had a population of 443; 437 Muslims and 6 Christians, (where the Christians all belonged to the Templar community),  increasing in the 1931 census to 658; 654 Muslim and 4 Christians, in a total of 127 houses.

In the 1945 statistics, the village had a population of 850;  830 Muslims and 20 Christians.

Al-Mas'udiyya had an elementary school  founded in 1931, and in 1945 it had 31 students.

1948, aftermath
In 1992, the village site was described: "The area is part of Tel Aviv. All that remains of the village is one deserted house that belonged to Muhammad Baydas. Cactuses, castor-oil (ricinus) plants, and palm and cypress trees further mark the site. Nearby is the al-Mas'udiyya (or Summayl) bridge – an arched, steel structure."

References

Bibliography

 
  

 
 
 

 (pp. 91, 126, 128, 384)

External links
Welcome To al-Mas'udiyya
 al-Mas'udiyya (Summayl), Zochrot
Survey of Western Palestine, Map 13: IAA,  Wikimedia commons
A Mosque Once Stood Here, Meron Rapoport Sep 16, 2005, Haaretz

Arab villages depopulated during the 1948 Arab–Israeli War
District of Jaffa